The Schreder Airmate HP-11 is an American mid-wing, V-tailed, single seat glider designed by Richard Schreder. Airmate was the name of Schreder's design company.

Design and development
The HP-11 (HP stands for high performance) was designed to compete in the FAI Open Class in the 1962 US Nationals and represented the designer's continued pursuit of the perfect competition sailplane.

The HP-11 is an all-metal design, with a wing that features a 26:1 aspect ratio, a  wingspan and a NACA 65 (3)-618 airfoil, the same airfoil that had been used on the HP-8 and HP-10.

A total of 42 HP-11s were built from kits and plans before production was ended in favour of the Schreder HP-14.

Operational history
Flying the HP-11 in the 1962 US Nationals, Schreder came in third in the competition and had the longest flight, . Schreder also flew it to third place in the Open Class at the 1963 World Gliding Championships held at Junín, Buenos Aires Province, Argentina. At that event Schreder flew a  flight.

In April 2011 there were 28 HP-11s registered with the US Federal Aviation Administration and three with Transport Canada.

Variants
HP-11
Initial model, with fixed monowheel landing gear.
HP-11A
Improved model for amateur construction from plans or kits, with a retractable monowheel landing gear.
Bowlus BZ-1
Version designed by Michael Bowlus with the front fuselage from a North American F-86 Sabre drop tank, the tail from an HP-18 and the wings from an HP-11.
Kohler Alpha
Version with a newly designed fuselage and HP-11 wings.

Aircraft on display
National Soaring Museum - HP-11A
US Southwest Soaring Museum - HP-11
Chico Air Museum - HP-11A

Specifications

See also

References

External links

Photo of an HP-11A

Schreder aircraft
1960s United States sailplanes
Aircraft first flown in 1962
V-tail aircraft
Shoulder-wing aircraft